Game Software Rating Regulations, also translated as Game Software Rating Management Regulations or Taiwan Entertainment Software Rating Information (TESRI), is the official video game content rating system used in Taiwan, and a de facto rating system for the Hong Kong and Southeast Asia markets. The rating system was established on July 6, 2006, and changed to its current style on May 29, 2012.

Ratings 
Currently, the system uses five ratings:

References

External links 
 Full text in Traditional Chinese (Laws and Regulations Database of the Republic of China (Taiwan))
 Full text in Traditional Chinese / English (Taiwan Game Software Rating Information) 
 Taiwan Game Software Rating Information (Traditional Chinese/English)

2006 establishments in Taiwan
Law of Taiwan
Communications and media organizations
Entertainment companies